Taki Station is the name of three train stations in Japan:

 Taki Station (Mie) (多気駅)
 Taki Station (Hyōgo) (滝駅)
 Taki Station (Tochigi) (滝駅)